I've Always Been Good at True Love is the debut studio album by American rock duo the I.L.Y's, featuring Zach Hill and Andy Morin of Death Grips. The album was released for free download on June 4, 2015, through Death Grips' vanity label Third Worlds.

Background and music
On June 4, 2015, Death Grips' Twitter account shared a download link for the album, hosted on Death Grips' Third Worlds website. No other information regarding to the album or the artist were provided which lead into fan theories and speculations. Fans and critics speculated that the I.L.Y's was a side project of Death Grips members involving Tera Melos guitarist Nick Reinhart or an opening act for the band's 2015 summer tour. On June 14, 2015, Death Grips confirmed that The I.L.Y's is a side project of Death Grips members Zach Hill and Andy Morin, and hinted that they plan on releasing the album physically.

Musically, the album features an art punk and a "noisy garage rock" sound. It has been regarded as a continuation of rock-oriented sound of Death Grips' fourth studio album, The Powers That B and drew comparisons to Hill's 2010 solo album Face Tat.

Critical reception

The album received mixed reviews from music critics. Consequence of Sound critic Brian Josephs stated: "I’ve always been good at true love is in line with the straightforward rock distortion of Jenny Death, but it’s nowhere near as exciting," with ultimately describing the album as "dried, blotchy, and bland."

Track listing

Personnel
The I.L.Y's
 Zach Hill – vocals, drums, keyboards, guitar, production
 Andy Morin – guitar, bass, engineering

References

External links
 

2015 debut albums
Self-released albums
Albums free for download by copyright owner
The I.L.Y's albums
Garage rock revival albums